Roberto da Rosa (born 6 July 1927) was a Brazilian sailor. He competed in the Flying Dutchman event at the 1960 Summer Olympics.

References

External links
 

1927 births
Possibly living people
Brazilian male sailors (sport)
Olympic sailors of Brazil
Sailors at the 1960 Summer Olympics – Flying Dutchman
Sportspeople from São Paulo